The European macroseismic scale (EMS) is the basis for evaluation of seismic intensity in European countries and is also used in a number of countries outside Europe. Issued in 1998 as an update of the test version from 1992, the scale is referred to as EMS-98.

Overview
The history of the EMS began in 1988 when the European Seismological Commission (ESC) decided to review and update the Medvedev–Sponheuer–Karnik scale (MSK-64), which was used in its basic form in Europe for almost a quarter of a century. After more than five years of intensive research and development and a four-year testing period, the new scale was officially released. In 1996 the XXV General Assembly of the ESC in Reykjavík passed a resolution recommending the adoption of the new scale by the member countries of the European Seismological Commission.

The European macroseismic scale EMS-98 is the first seismic intensity scale designed to encourage co-operation between engineers and seismologists, rather than being for use by seismologists alone. It comes with a detailed manual, which includes guidelines, illustrations, and application examples.

Unlike the earthquake magnitude scales, which express the seismic energy released by an earthquake, EMS-98 intensity denotes how strongly an earthquake affects a specific place. The European macroseismic scale has 12 divisions, as follows:

See also 
Seismic intensity scales
Seismic magnitude scales

External links 
 Macroseismic Scale (full text in multiple languages)

Seismic intensity scales